The International Basketball League (IBL) was a short-lived professional men's basketball league in the United States. The IBL was headquartered in Baltimore, Maryland. The league started in 1999 and ended in 2001.

History 
The International Basketball League was founded in early 1999 and made plans to begin play in fall of that year.  The first season did not quite meet expectations with attendance, but the league was still largely functional, with the Saint Louis Swarm winning the first championship. The second season was significantly rougher, with the league losing the Baltimore and San Diego franchises and merging with teams from the Continental Basketball Association after that league folded early in 2000. The Swarm won the championship of that league in the second season, and although the league had stated that it would return for a third season, this was not to be the case, and all the teams folded soon after the season ended, although the teams from the former CBA ultimately restarted the CBA the following year. Although the league had some innovations such as playing the international three-point line and trapezoid lane, and with the intention to offer professional basketball and more reasonable ticket prices, the cost structure of the league was simply too great for the revenue and attendance figures that it received.

The International Basketball League (IBL) was first proposed in 1996 as a single-structure organization similar to Major League Soccer. Because of this players were paid by the league and not the team's owners. The IBL also had classes they called "Player Education/Life Readiness Plan" in which IBL players were informed about scholarship opportunities and how to balance school and professional basketball. Plans for the league to begin play were tentatively set for November 1997 with 10 unidentified franchise in the United States. 

The league sought to have college players or high school players join their league instead of playing in the NCAA, where they could not receive compensation for their play. NCAA spokesperson Katherine Rice responded to the IBL by saying, "As an educational program, we prefer young people to get an education as a basis for their sports activities."

A two-day meeting was held in St. Louis, Missouri on January 19, 1999 with over 50 IBL owners, executives and advisers in attendance. They were briefed on several things including potential television contracts, the IBL draft and the playoffs.

On February 15, 1999 IBL president Thaxter Trafton announced the team would begin the season on November 26, 1999. Paul Martha served as the IBL vice president and general legal council.

Clubs 

 The Gary Steelheads folded in 2008 after last playing in the International Basketball League, which had no association with the 1999 to 2001 IBL
 The Grand Rapids Hoops joined the re-organized Continental Basketball Association (CBA) in 2001 and played until 2003
 The Rockford Lightning joined the re-organized CBA in 2001 and played until 2006
 The only franchise from the IBL that is still in existence are the Sioux Falls Skyforce, who now play in the NBA G League.

Map

Postseason results

2000 IBL Playoffs

2001 IBL Playoffs

League awards

Most valuable player 
1999–00: Doug Smith, St. Louis Swarm
2000–01: Danny Johnson, St. Louis Swarm

Playoffs MVP 
1999–00: not named
2000–01: Maurice Carter

Rookie of the year 
1999–00: Danny Johnson, St. Louis Swarm
2000–01: Neil Edwards, Gary Steelheads

Coach of the year 
1999–00: Bernie Bickerstaff, St. Louis Swarm
2000–01: Bernie Bickerstaff, St. Louis Swarm

All–IBL teams

1999–2000
First team:
Danny Johnson, St. Louis Swarm
Ryan Lorthridge, Trenton Shooting Stars
Tremaine Fowlkes, Cincinnati Stuff
J. R. Henderson, Las Vegas Silver Bandits
Doug Smith, St. Louis Swarm

Second team:
Isaac Burton, Las Vegas Silver Bandits
Jason Sasser, New Mexico Slam
Alex Sanders, Cincinnati Stuff
Ray Tutt, Trenton Shooting Stars
Rocky Walls, Las Vegas Silver Bandits

2000–2001
First team:
Antonio Smith, Grand Rapids Hoops
Danny Johnson, St. Louis Swarm
Ray Tutt, Trenton Shooting Stars
Roderick Blakney, Cincinnati Stuff
Jeff Sanders, Rockford Lightning

Statistical leaders

References

External links
INTERNATIONAL BASKETBALL LEAGUE HISTORY on apbr.org

 
 
Sports leagues established in 1999
Organizations disestablished in 2001
1999 establishments in Maryland
Defunct basketball leagues in the United States
2001 disestablishments in Maryland